Matahari Books is a Malaysian publishing company founded in 2007 by Amir Muhammad. It specialises in Malaysian non-fiction  and also screenplay books.  It publishes books in both English and Malay.

Titles 

Non-fiction titles:
 Malaysian Politicians Say the Darndest Things (Vol 1) (2007) compiled by Amir Muhammad with illustrations by Shahril Nizam.
 New Malaysian Essays 1 (2008) edited by Amir Muhammad.
 New Malaysian Essays 2 (2009) edited by Amir Muhammad.
 New Malaysian Essays 3 (2010) edited by Yin Shao Loong
 Malaysian Politicians Say the Darndest Things (Vol 2) (2008) compiled by Amir Muhammad with artwork by Fahmi Reza
 The Malaysian Book of the Undead (2008) by Danny Lim
 Kitab Pengetahuan Hantu Malaysia (2008) by Danny Lim (translated by Ahmad Kamal Abu Bakar)
 Taxi Tales on a Crooked Bridge (2009) by Charlene Rajendran
 Yasmin Ahmad's Films (2009) by Amir Muhammad
 What Your Teacher Didn't Tell You (The Annexe Lectures, Vol 1.) (2009) by Farish A. Noor
 120 Malay Movies (2010) by Amir Muhammad.
 Islam in Malaysia: Perceptions & Facts (2010) by Mohd Asri Zainul Abidin

Mixed anthologies:
 Body 2 Body: A Malaysian Queer Anthology (2009) edited by Jerome Kugan and Pang Khee Teik
 Orang Macam Kita edited by Azwan Ismail and Diana Dirani

Screenplay books:
 KAMI the Movie (2008)
 ESTET (2009)
 Pisau Cukur (2009)

External links 
 Matahari Books official site
 Matahari Books on Amazon.com.
 "Hitting the books" in The Star (Malaysia) - 8 April 2009

Notes 

2007 establishments in Malaysia
Book publishing companies of Malaysia
Privately held companies of Malaysia